The Assault of Ayacucho prison was an incident in the Peruvian city of Ayacucho, also known as Huamanga, on March 2, 1982. A group of 150 armed terrorists, members of the Sendero Luminoso, or Shining Path, staged simultaneous assaults on two local police stations before staging an assault on the prison, resulting in the release of 255 inmates. After a 5-hour battle, 16 people, including two prison guards, were dead and 12 people were wounded.

History
Though a core group of activists had formed as early as 1964 with Abimael Guzmán, Sendero Luminoso was not formally founded until 1970 as an extension of the Peru Communist Party (PCP). The group is localized in the Upper Huallaga Valley of Peru as well as in parts of the Apurímac Valley in Ayacucho, including areas of the Apurímac national park.

Guzmán, also referred to as Chairman or Presidente Gonzalo, believed revolution would come about through Maoist principles.

Selection of Target
In principle, an asymmetric attack never occurs in isolation; selection of the target is the first step in the cycle of a terrorist assignment or undertaking.

The assault on the prison in Ayacucho was due to the selection by the leader of the Sendero Luminoso, Abimael Guzman, predominantly underground and asymmetric ideologically motivated. Gonzalo selected the target, out of many possibilities, in obedience to a defined strategy to make concrete achievements. That is why the selected target has to be paid to their propaganda purposes and the methods of approach in selecting the target, unconventional.

Sendero Luminoso, as a non-state actor, used several factors to achieve its objective: deception, surprise, speed, movement, and use of weapons in an unexpected way to try to substantially alter the scene of fighting breaking all the paradigms and principles of war.

Reason behind target selection
In this guerrilla war, important factors in determining the target included:

A significant number of their operators had been captured, including Hildebrand Huarancca Perez, Edith Lagos Carlos Alcantara, Eucario Najarro, Amilcar Urday Maximilian Urday, Isabel Sanches Cobarrubias, and Nelly Diaz Chavez.
The release of 70 detainees would be the boldest stroke of the Shining Path to demoralize the police force.
The game was a few days before a crucial meeting, the Second National Conference of the PC P-SL, which was inaugurated to celebrate the release of the first contingent of prisoners.

Operational Planning
Abimael Guzmán (led by Mao Zedong's communist ideals) put into practice what he learned in the Political-Military School of Nanking Shanghai by training Latin American activists. They were inspired by the Cultural Revolution of  the 1965–1976 People's Republic of China, and guided by aspects of the People's War. Abimael took actions of intelligence, security, and planned in secret somewhere in Lima, the assault on the prison in Ayacucho.

"Having determined the objective, we proceeded to choose the cells with qualified personnel to carry out the terrorist attack, which involved forming and much depends on the chosen action and tactics, and the importance of the primary target and secondary collateral for the implementation of diversionary maneuvers on the local security forces... "Faceless War" - Vladimiro Montesinos.

"When you want to fight us, do not allow and can not find. But when we want to fight you, make sure you can not escape and we can hit it squarely and exterminate. The enemy advances, we go back, the enemy camps, we harass the enemy tires, we attack" - Mao Zedong.

Abimael's soldiers began attacks on Ayacucho and Cangallo-Fajardo. The attack was planned as follows:
 Strike one: the Shining Path prisoners mutiny.
 Strike two: the criminal assault by a squadron of five armed men protected by snipers, located on Wonderland Road, Abimael Guzman indicated the houses where they should locate the snipers.
 Containment: other attackers would retain the officers on their premises and withdrawal: reduced to detainees by prison guards, would open the access gate and the rescue truck must reach the Garcilozo Calle de la Vega.

Actions of the Republican Guard of Peru
In March 1982, the intelligence of the Republican Guard of Peru, reported an imminent armed attack on the prison Huamanga Gagliani. The Interior Minister was informed, prepared to reinforce the jail with 20 men, and ordered measures were taken to the department head of the Republican Guard, Commander Victor de la Cruz. The staff of the intelligence director of the Republican Guard in Lima contacted the head of the Huamanga prison Rosember the south Lieutenant Herbert, who gave the voice alarm. The reinforcements arrived, but commander, Victor de la Cruz, decided to put to rest in his quarters.

The other police chiefs, Colonel Carlos Delgado Matallana Civil Guard and the colonel of the Police Department Andes Morales Vega had not received clear information about the possible attack.

Implementation
The implementation of an asymmetric attack was performed by attacking the primary and secondary targets as planned.

On February 27, the Senderistas reviewed the plans for the attack. The night of February 28, 1982, the plan failed. "Clara" and "César" criticized each other resulting in hesitation and the plan's failure. Pursuant to the provisions, prisoners rioted. The attackers were in their positions, but never got the truck to rescue the prisoners. César declared the action canceled. The riot police were called. There were three dead and two Senderistas, and Amilcar Najarro Eucario Urday were seriously injured and sent to the regional hospital Huamanga. Gonzalo's anger was forwarded to the responsible, and Gonzalo gave a final order. Guzman asked again to attack the prison Huamanga, to the amazement of the combatants.

At 19:00 hours of March 2, a group of three Senderistas dressed as policemen, convinced a truck driver to transport them. The truck driver and his assistant were held at gunpoint and restrained at the height of the reservoir of Urbanization Mariscal Cáceres by the rebels. The fighters began their tasks, and the truck was parked at the rear of the jail.

At 23:30 or so, there was a blackout in Huamanga and several explosions were heard, and subversive elements were firing at different units based in Huamanga. Strategic fighters emerged from their hiding places. They were divided strategically in the city for three simultaneous attacks of greater magnitude against the headquarters of the Guardia Civil del Peru, the head of the Investigative Police of Peru general headquarters of the Republican Guard Peru, and, again, the prison. They also attacked the homes of the Prefect of the Department and President of the Superior Court of Ayacucho. For this action, the party met for the first time the fighters of Principal Regional Committee (CRP), Ayacucho-area-fighters led by Elvira Ramirez Aranda "comrade Clara" and Fajardo Cangallo-Oscar Vera Ramos "Comrade César." The city was protected by more than 300 police, settled in three locations. The barracks called "BIM 51, The Cabitos," housed three hundred soldiers and was four km from the prison. At the same time, the prison had a supply of 20 guards of which only 7 were in prison, and 20 other soldiers backing the republic rested at the headquarters.

The Republican Guard Florencio Arone Guillen was the first to fall, killed by snipers in the tower. Immediately, the rebels climbed with ladders and ropes down to the walls of the prison. They made their way with explosions; they placed dynamite between the gates and the wall separating one room from the other. The prisoners organized Senderistas and joined the attackers.
The attack was more intense in the main entrance of the prison, which housed the largest number of Republican guards. Republican Guard Joseph Rea Count was shot. The initial shooting was followed by blasts of dynamite. They destroyed ceiling, walls, doors and windows.
Republicans, decimated by the firepower of the rebels abandoned any attempt to fight, and hid in different compartments of an office.
Other groups of snipers fired upon the local Civil Guard, the PIP, and the Republican Guard and more dynamite blasts occurred. At the sight of their fellow officers being injured, many officers barricaded themselves in their barracks.

Through streets of Ayacucho, groups of Senderistas hunted down policemen, and the guard guarding the governor's house was strafed by the rebels. In less than half an hour Shining Path achieved effective control of Ayacucho.
In Lima, Lopez Marines established radio contact with staff in Ayacucho; he only heard cries of despair in the communications coming from the barracks attack. López Martínez communicated with President Belaunde who would inform him of the collapse of the police and communicate the news to the Minister of War General Luis Cisneros Vizquerra Peruvian Army.
Lopez received communications that  the Marines was growing anxiety. PIP Colonel Andres Morales Vega asked for desperate relief troops of the "Cabitos."

In the ninth commander of the Guardia Civil, the situation was hardly better. A greater number of troops had surrounded the Senderistas, and fire was more serious than elsewhere. For more than half an hour, the police garrison could not manage to make any coordinated attack, so they remained at their facility. Colonel Delgado Matallana only managed to control the perimeter of the barracks and organize a group of sinchis, commanded by Captain Guillermo Linares Bay, head of the detachment of the 48 Command. The Sinchis in Huamanga were directed to the prison, where it was apparent that the most important trail operation was taking place.

Captain Linares Bay and the sinchis, after holding a gun battle Senderistas and pushing back the first sector attacking GC, had continued forward, until arriving near the prison. Then they were confronted by the main Senderistas. The sinchis, Linares Bay, and others were wounded, and the rest of his group was forced to withdraw.
Senderistas also suffered heavy casualties in the clash. Among them, the doctor Eduardo Mata Mendoza.
The shooting with the group of Bay Linares told the Senderistas that their situation was precarious. The element of surprise, had been paralyzing their enemies, began to fade and the operation could end in disaster. The immediate evacuation of the city was hurried so that the bodies of the terrorists killed in the clash were not collected which would go against customs.

Senderistas had released all prisoners in jail. So while the escapees were organized, and some of them boarded the van, the fight raged again.

In the rush to leave the city, the plans to release the Senderistas in the hospital were scrapped.
They passed a police checkpoint and shot at the Senderistas within. They then lost their route to Huancavelica.

From the headquarters of the Republican Guard, the commander of the Cross, as he explained later, had entrusted a captain to go to the prison with reinforcements. He added that he had remained barricaded until the attack ended.
However, the large windows of the barracks had suffered no broken glass, and there were no visible bullet impacts on walls. Meaning the PIP could only have been shot on the ledge of his headquarters.

The action lasted only half an hour, and was a success. Thirty-three attackers (one hundred police report subversive) released seventy-eight Senderistas have comrades who were Edith Lagos Saez and Pérez Huarancca Hildebrand. Reduced to seven Republican Guard, seized their weapons and settled, released all the common criminals and Senderistas, gathered in the courtyard, raised a red flag with hammer and sickle, singing the Internationale and out the door. The means: six guns FAL, six rifles, and fifteen machine guns.

Subsequent Actions
After serving with the primary, secondary, and generating chaos, they proceed to a withdrawal and dispersed using predetermined escape routes.

Sendero made attacks on police posts in cold blood in the countryside and cities.

Replay of the Second National Conference of the SL-PCP Centra Committee
They deal with issues: Evolution of the guerrilla war and criticisms of Peruvian politics from a Marxist–Leninist viewpoint and M.

In June 1982, the Ayacucho area committee performs the retransmission of the Second National Conference. Intermediate leaders, cadres and fighters, resibieron - they were retransmitted - the report of the Centra SL-PCP.
He started singing The International, who started the meeting was Aurelio comrade "Self," junior minister and military command of the zonal committee of Ayacucho.

Aurelio, addressed the attendees.
- Partners - I say, on behalf of the Communist Party of Peru, and commissioned by the central committee, as a military commander and being in the leadership of the guerrilla zone, I start of the second national conference. And I do my unconditional subjection to the leadership, the party president, Comrade Gonzalo.

It calms the applause and enters silence to listen to Comrade "Clara," which broke with his voice.

- I express my absolute subjection to the head, my total, full, full, unconditional support to the most illustrious son of the class, which masterfully led the second national conference. My subject who runs the People's War in Peru, the beacon of world revolution.

And I would add: - Full subject to my game, my full subject to our general political line, holding my full unbeaten to our conception of Marxism–Leninism and Maoism-Gonzalo thought of Comrade guide.

Clara explained the agenda. First point, retransmission. So, the summary of the second conference. Second point, a position where there would be room for two-line struggle, the Maoist method of resolving contradictions to advance through criticism and self-criticism. Clara took more than a day talking about the debates on the status of the class struggle and the balance of the Shares of the party.

Similarly, broadcast Clara Gonzalo's words about what he called four questions about power: how to conquer it, they give out how to keep it, share it with. One, the power was for the party and class, and not personal fiefdoms. Another, annihilate the forces of the enemy to keep their own. The other two reflect the inescapable need to ally with the peasants, but after settling its small political world to the authorities, the gamonalillos, the police, the informers, the rebellious peasants. Thus the third principle was beat to move towards the base areas. And the fourth creating base. He had destroyed all the old state representative in the country, where would grow like a garden rose bourgeois. The People's Committees of the New Power.

The military campaign was carried out in phase designed by Gonzalo Thought: preparation, initiation, development, auction, complement. And with five forms of struggle: armed propaganda and agitation, sabotage, selective annihilation, fighting guerrillas and armed strikes.

Consequences
The next morning, the police combined forces and killed three of the five prisoners in hospital Senderistas public Huamanga.
The combination of both actions, the attack on the prison and the execution of hospitalized hikers, gave Sendero a media victory.
That day, the interior minister, Joseph Giaglini Schiafino, was about to resign.
The assault on the prison Huamanga forced observers to consider the PCP as a greater threats as terrorists compared to just their isolated killings.
Senderistas created an environment of insecurity in the government.
It began the entry of armed forces in the fight against subversion and the beginning of intelligence operations.
On December 27, 1982, President Fernando Belaunde Terry gave an ultimatum of 72 hours of PCP to lay down their weapons. Sendero rejected the request, and on December 30, the government put the Armed Forces in control of the Ayacucho emergency zone.

References 

 Truth and Reconciliation Commission (Peru)
 
 
 
 
 
 
 Vlamiro Montesinos, faceless War
 The most dangerous American loco http://www.elpais.com/articulo/espana/loco/peligroso/America/elpepunac/20051010elpepinac_1/Tes
 EXTRAJUDICIAL AYACUCHO HOSPITAL (1982) http://www.pagina-libre.org/asociacion-peru/Textos/Documentacion/CVR_HospitalAyacucho.html
 The death of General Noel and destroy myths http://www.peruinforma.com/imwebsite/article.php?sid=23225
 The writer of mysteries trail http://www.larepublica.pe/archive/all/domingo/20080914/1/node/164703/todos/1558
 Political violence in Peru. https://web.archive.org/web/20120325002605/http://www.desco.org.pe/apc-aa-files/d38fb34df77ec8a36839f7aad10def69/Violencia.pdf
Jesus Matthew Sosa

Attacks on police stations in the 1980s
Shining Path
Internal conflict in Peru
Prison escapes
History of Ayacucho Region
Attacks on buildings and structures in 1982